Lepthoplosternum tordilho is a species of catfish of the family Callichthyidae that is found in the lower Jacui River drainage in southern Brazil.

References
 

Callichthyidae
Fish of South America
Fish of Brazil
Taxa named by Roberto Esser dos Reis
Fish described in 1997